John Henderson Blackley (born 12 May 1948) is a Scottish football coach and former player.

Blackley made 279 appearances at centre-half for Hibernian and also represented Newcastle United, Preston North End and Hamilton Academical. He won seven Scottish international caps and represented his country in the 1974 FIFA World Cup, playing in the 2–0 win against Zaire.

Blackley began a managerial career with Hamilton in October 1981, while continuing his playing career. He left Hamilton in 1983 and became a player/coach at Hibs, his first senior club, and was then promoted to the manager's position at Easter Road in 1984. His final managerial role was at Cowdenbeath, which he left to become Gordon Wallace's assistant at Dundee.

Blackley has since worked at several clubs with Paul Sturrock, including St Johnstone, Dundee United, Plymouth Argyle twice, Sheffield Wednesday and Swindon Town. His brief has been to work specifically with the defenders, passing on the experience he accrued in his 17-year playing career. Blackley was part of a successful coaching trio alongside Paul Sturrock and Kevin Summerfield that saw them achieve four promotions in six seasons. Blackley and Summerfield left Plymouth in October 2009 after being advised their contracts, which were due to expire at the end of the 2009–10 season, were not going to be renewed.

In 2011, Blackley was assistant manager of Stirling Albion, working alongside Jocky Scott. He left the club in December 2011.

References

External links
 

1948 births
Living people
Footballers from Falkirk (council area)
Association football defenders
Scottish footballers
Scotland international footballers
1974 FIFA World Cup players
Hamilton Academical F.C. players
Hibernian F.C. players
Newcastle United F.C. players
Preston North End F.C. players
Scottish Football League players
English Football League players
Scottish football managers
Hamilton Academical F.C. managers
Hibernian F.C. managers
Cowdenbeath F.C. managers
Dundee F.C. managers
Plymouth Argyle F.C. non-playing staff
St Johnstone F.C. non-playing staff
Dundee F.C. non-playing staff
Scottish Football League representative players
Scottish Football League managers
Scotland under-23 international footballers